LVN Pictures, Inc. was a Filipino film studio that was considered one of the biggest in the history of Philippine cinema and its foremost establishment in motion picture post-production until 2005. In its heyday of motion picture production, LVN Pictures has been compared to that of the Metro-Goldwyn-Mayer Studios (MGM) of Hollywood because it had, under contract, the biggest stars and film craftsmen of the period. Before its closure in 2005, LVN Pictures was known as one of the oldest living film studios in the country.

History

Establishment and World War II (From 1938 to 1945)
LVN Pictures was formed by the De Leon ["L"], Villongco ["V"], and Navoa ["N"] families before the onset of World War II in 1938.  At that time, the American-occupied Philippines was a ready market for American films, which further influenced various filmmakers like Jose Nepomuceno (the Father of Philippine Movies) to set up various film production companies to produce Tagalog movies.

With its creation, LVN Pictures offered a rival to then-newly established Sampaguita Pictures of the Vera-Perez family. LVN chose the big piece of land in P. Tuazon Boulevard, C. Benitez and St. Peter Street in Cubao, Quezon City as its home, and for the next seven decades, the lot would become the backlot and administration location of the studio. The LVN Gate, with the initials of the studio emblazoned in red letters and set in white beams, became as famous as the Paramount Pictures gate, and the big LVN Studios logo atop the Main Building became as famous as the MGM logo atop its main building. To oversee its production facilities, Doña Narcisa de Leon of the De Leon family took over the company as its president and "Executive Producer". She was the first Filipina film mogul. Eventually due to circumstances, the uninvolvement of the Villongco (which was preceded by the demise of one of the founders Carmen "Doña Mameng" Suarez Villongco) and Navoa families in the 1960s onwards, she bought a majority of their shares, which made LVN a De Leon family company.

The studio's first offering was the musical Giliw Ko (one of the very few Pre-War Filipino Films still extant today), which starred the three biggest stars of the era (Ely Ramos, Fernando Poe, Sr. and Fleur de Lis [who subsequently became Mona Lisa]) and introduced Mila del Sol. The movie, released in 1939, was a box-office success. In 1941, LVN introduced another trend. The first Filipino film in color (utilizing the "Varicolor" process), Ibong Adarna, was produced by LVN and was directed by Vicente Salumbides. The color sequence of the film, which was the singing of the bird, was painstakingly hand colored. The film also starred Mila del Sol, Fred Cortes and Manuel Conde and was a box-office success. Nevertheless, the growth of the studio was hampered due to World War II and the Japanese Occupation, which ravaged Manila and the rest of the Philippines from January 2, 1942, to February 1945. Due to the hardships of the war and to avoid being used as a Japanese propaganda center, LVN closed shop.

During this period, LVN Pictures has discovered and developed the following stars: Rogelio de la Rosa, Jaime de la Rosa, Mila del Sol, Fred Cortes, Norma Blancaflor, Lilia Dizon, Rosa Rosal, and Vicente Alberto to name a few.

Post-World War II years
After the Liberation of Manila in 1945, LVN Pictures immediately resumed film productions. The LVN stars who had to do stage shows when it closed shop was again making movies. LVN produced Miss Philippines (1947) with Norma Blancaflor and Jose "Pempe" Padilla, Jr., Ginang Takaichi (1948) with Lilia Dizon and Sa Tokyo Ikinasal (1948) with Rogelio de la Rosa, Tessie Quintana, Celia Flor and Armando Goyena, all of which pertain to the Japanese occupation of the Philippines. In the 1950s, at the height of the Communist threat in the Philippines, LVN Pictures collaborated with the Philippine government in vilifying communism by producing three films that were against Communism, namely Kontrabando (1950), FAMAS Award-winner Korea (1952), and FAMAS Best Picture Huk sa Bagong Pamumuhay (1953). Aside from these, LVN also produced its specialty, the musicals, namely Sarung Banggi (1947) and Mutya ng Pasig (1950), to name a few.

The Golden Age of Philippine Cinema (The 1950s)
The so-called First Golden Age of Philippine Cinema commenced in the 1950s with the flourishing establishment of the so-called Big Four studios, namely LVN Pictures, Sampaguita Pictures, Lebran International and Premiere Productions, with each studio specializing in different genres. Sampaguita Pictures specialized in high-glossed society pictures and musicals. Premiere Productions and Lebran International specialized in action pictures. LVN, on the other hand, became known for its "superproductions," the Hollywood equivalent of "epic" films that was complemented by the LVN superstars that starred in these films. The various superproductions of LVN were Ibong Adarna (1955), Lapu-Lapu (1955) and the movie classics Badjao (1956), Anak Dalita (1957) and Biyaya ng Lupa (1959). At this time, LVN Pictures emerged as the biggest film studio of the Philippines, releasing two to three films a month in 1955–1956.

Indeed, during this time, LVN Pictures housed the biggest and most popular stars of the period. With Narcisa de Leon still helming LVN Pictures, the studio managed to maintain its resident female contravida (antagonist) FAMAS-winner Rosa Rosal, the then undisputed King of Philippine Movies and FAMAS-winner Rogelio de la Rosa, FAMAS-nominee Lilia Dizon, FAMAS-winner Jose Padilla, Jr., Jaime de la Rosa, Celia Flor, Mila del Sol, Corazon Noble, Norma Blancaflor and a handful of other stars. In addition, LVN added to its roster FAMAS winners Charito Solis (introduced in Niña Bonita in 1955), Nida Blanca, Leroy Salvador, Armando Goyena, Tony Santos, Sr., Oscar Keesee, Gil de Leon, Eddie Rodriguez and a handful of other stars. Delia Razon, Daisy Romualdez, Nestor de Villa, Mario Montenegro, Norma Vales, Lou Salvador, Jr., Marita Zobel and Sylvia La Torre are the other stars added to LVN during this period. In addition to stars, LVN also prided itself in the film artisans that it had on contract. The make-up legend Manahan Sisters, directors Lamberto Avellana and Gerardo de Leon (who became FAMAS winners), musician Tito Arevalo and editor Ike Jarlego were few of the many talented film artisans that were, one year or another, in contract with the studio.

LVN Pictures prided itself on the creation of what was perhaps the most popular love team of all time, the Nida Blanca-Nestor de Villa love team. The two stars, who were also gifted in the field of dancing and singing, gave LVN a boost on the box-office with their films Waray-Waray (1954), Kalyehera (1957), and Talusaling (1958). The love team gave Sampaguita Pictures a competition, which led them to build up their number-one star, Gloria Romero, with the dashing Luis Gonzales. Nevertheless, the Nida-Nestor love team had one thing that the Gloria-Luis lacked: the gift of dance. Nida-Nestor danced their way to the box-office, and even later to television with their own show.

In addition, LVN's desire to equal Sampaguita Pictures' drama excellence was also answered. By the 1950s, Sampaguita drama empresses Lolita Rodriguez, Marlene Dauden and Rita Gomez were already held in check by LVN's very own drama empress Charito Solis. Charito Solis starred in the blockbuster films Malvarosa (1958), Kundiman ng Lahi (1959) and Emily (1960). To answer for the hugely popular action films of Premiere Productions and Lebran International, LVN also developed its resident hunk Mario Montenegro, Jaime de la Rosa and Jose Padilla, Jr., to do action films like Huk sa Bagong Pamumuhay (1953) and Lapu-Lapu (1955). LVN also featured its own roster of antagonists or contravidas which brought "hell" to Filipino screens like Eusebio Gomez, Oscar Keesee, Jr., Rosa Rosal, Gil de Leon, Rebecca del Rio and Rosa Aguirre to name a few. LVN also had under contract the brightest singing stars of the period like Diomedes Maturan, Sylvia La Torre and Marita Zobel.  La Torre later teamed up with Eddie San Jose in LVN's series of comedies starring the team of Pugo and Bentot.

In 1955, LVN Pictures again set another landmark by remaking Ibong Adarna in 1955, starring the then-popular love team of Nida Blanca and Nestor de Villa. The movie became the first Filipino film to ever grossed one million pesos and hugely promoted the love team of Blanca and de Villa. In 1956, LVN brought international fame to the Philippines when its superproduction Badjao (1956) starring Rosa Rosal won the Golden Harvest Award (Best Picture) at the Asia-Pacific Film Festival. From this point on, LVN's superproductions figured in various film festivals and competitions all over the world, winning Best Picture Awards and acting awards in the process.

In the local scene, LVN Pictures also dominated the Awards of the Filipino Academy of Movie Arts and Sciences (FAMAS Awards) by amassing a total of 11 nominations for Best Picture. In total, it won 4 Best Picture awards, 1 Best Short Film Award, and 1 Best Featurette Award. In addition, LVN Pictures holds the record for the most FAMAS International Prestige Awards of Merit, the award of the FAMAS that gives recognition to productions that were recognized internationally. At a time when movie studios were only receiving one or two of these in a decade, LVN has managed to collect four of them for the films Anak Dalita (1957), Malvarosa (1958), Bayanihan and My Serenade (both 1961).

Nevertheless, due to the heavy competition that LVN Pictures experienced from Hollywood films and even local television, the Golden Age of Philippine cinema was the only boost it needed to survive as a corporation.

The 1960s and onwards
On May 31, 1961, LVN stopped producing motion pictures and suddenly decided to switch to post-production. The decision was not surprising; even though LVN was releasing box-office successes, the earnings from these films were used to pay off existing loans and debts from various Philippine banks. By 1961, LVN pictures was already nearing practical bankruptcy due to "causes beyond its control." In 1961, LVN Pictures has already cut back the salaries of its workers by 5-20% while its losses for the year was already more than P333,000.  But LVN is not alone; among the rest of the Big Four, only Sampaguita Pictures survived to the seventies, and even this famed studio later closed shop in the eighties.

The stars of LVN Pictures became freelancers when LVN stopped its production of films, many of whom went to its sister company, Dalisay Pictures. The remaining moviemaking equipment of LVN such as cameras, lights, and others were loaned to various movie outfits and independent producers such as Cirio Santiago, Larry Santiago Productions, Dalisay Pictures, People's Pictures, and others at P13,000 per picture. In the meantime, LVN Pictures moved to post-production, which specialized in color processing and editing of films for Philippine cinema and advertising. For the next forty years, LVN engaged in post-production, which was said to be the best in Asia.

In 1977 and 1980, LVN Pictures made two attempts at movie production with the releases of the romantic drama Kung Mangarap Ka't Magising and the hugely successful comedy Kakabakaba Ka Ba? (1980) starring Christopher de Leon, Charo Santos, Jay Ilagan and Sandy Andolong. The movie earned LVN Pictures its last nomination for Best Picture at the FAMAS Awards.

Closure
In 2005, LVN Pictures also decided to close its post-production facilities at the old studio lot, which was now almost decrepit due to forty years of non-film production. The reason for LVN Pictures' final closure was the lessening number of Filipino films that availed of their post-production services. Indeed, the Philippine film industry was already slumping to 53 films a year. The costs of maintaining the equipment at the LVN Studios exceeded the revenue that it received from post-production, so on June 30, 2005, LVN's post-production equipment went up for sale and was bought by an unnamed group of businessmen. Nevertheless, the LVN Museum, the lot, and the studio buildings themselves were not part of the buy-out. At the time of the purchase, the whole LVN Pictures was valued at P45 million.

After the studio's closure, LVN's studios in Cubao, Quezon City was turned into a high-rise building.

Legacy
LVN Pictures is the first of its kind in Philippine movie history. It was the movie studio that set many trends in the forefront of Philippine cinema. At the time of its height, it was also the biggest and most powerful studio of the time, nestling under its wing countless number of big stars that went on to become Filipino screen legends, acclaimed directors that helmed Filipino film classics and numerous film artisans that helped define the Filipino film. Its power was even recognized by its three-film tie-up with the Philippine government during the Communist threat era of the 1950s.

Its glorious impact, not only in the movie industry but also to the millions and legions of fans that watched its films had an indelible and unwavering contribution to the development of Filipino culture as a whole. From the FAMAS Best Picture Huk sa Bagong Pamumuhay, which told its viewers that no matter how bad a person may be, he could still redeem himself; to the FAMAS honoree Anak Dalita (1956), which chronicled human perseverance in the face of war, LVN Pictures has definitely influenced the Filipino of the 1950s, which still echoes into the Philippines' subconscious up to the present. And still more fans were added when these pictures were later shown in Philippine television in the 1960s and 1970s.

To maintain the legacy of LVN Pictures and the films it made, ABS-CBN Corporation, the Philippines' largest media conglomerate, bought LVN Pictures productions shortly after its closure and showcased them from time to time in its television film arm, Cinema One, which is aired not only in the Philippines but also in many parts of the world. The films are now also being archived in the state-of-the-art facilities of ABS-CBN Network.

Digital restoration 
The ABS-CBN Film Archives is responsible for protecting and storing the LVN classics in their vaults at the ELJ Communications Center in Quezon City as well as the props and costumes used by the actors in the films, as part of the agreement they agreed on.

With the advent of the digital age, ABS-CBN's Sagip Pelikula campaign restored some of the black and white LVN classics including Ibong Adarna (1941), Anak Dalita (1956), Badjao (1957), Malvarosa (1958), and Biyaya ng Lupa (1959) through 4K digital scans and partial restorations. The LVN films directed by Mike de Leon, Kung Mangarap Ka't Magising and Kakabakaba Ka Ba?, were respectively restored and remastered by ABS-CBN with the help of Central Digital Lab in Makati City and L'Immagine Ritrovata in Bologna, Italy.

List of LVN Pictures films
1939 - Giliw Ko: Fernando Poe, Ely Ramos, Mila del Sol and Fleur de Lis (Mona Lisa) (first LVN film, produced in 1938)
1941 - Ibong Adarna: Mila del Sol, Fred Cortes, Ester Magalona
1946 - Ang Prinsiping Hindi Tumatawa: Rogelio de la Rosa & Mila del Sol
1946 - Garrison 13: Rogelio de la Rosa, Jaime de la Rosa, Mila del Sol & Linda Estrella
1946 - Aladin: Jaime de la Rosa
1946 - Orasang Ginto: Mila del Sol & Elvira Reyes
1946 - Victory Joe: Rogelio de la Rosa & Norma Blancaflor
1947 - Miss Philippines: Jose Padilla, Jr. & Norma Blancaflor
1947 - Bagong Manunubos
1947 - Ikaw ay Akin
1947 - Binatang Taring
1947 - Romansa
1947 - Magkaibang Lahi: Corazon Noble & Ely Ramos
1947 - Sarung Banggi: Rogelio de la Rosa & Mila del Sol
1948 - Kaaway ng Babae: Jose Padilla, Jr. & Lilia Dizon
1948 - Kambal Na Ligaya: Leopoldo Salcedo & Lilia Dizon
1948 - Engkantada
1948 - Krus na Bituin
1948 - Waling-Waling
1948 - Tanikalang papel
1948 - Pista sa Nayon: Jose Padilla, Jr.& Rebecca Gonzales
1948 - Sa Tokyo Ikinasal: Rogelio de la Rosa, Celia Flor, Armando Goyena & Tessie Quintana
1948 - Sierra Madre, bundok ng hiwaga: Leopoldo Salcedo
1948 - Sumpaan: Ely Ramos & Rosa Rosal
1949 - Biglang Yaman: Jaime de la Rosa, Rosa Rosal, Pugo & Togo
1949 - Capas: Leopoldo Salcedo & Celia Flor
1949 - Parola: Jaime de la Rosa & Norma Blancaflor
1949 - Gitano
1949 - Tambol Mayor
1949 - Batalyon XIII: Jaime de la Rosa & Carmen Rosales
1949 - Don Juan Teñoso
1950 - Mutya ng Pasig: Jose Padilla, Jr., Rebecca Gonzales, Roger Nite, Teody Belarmino & Delia Razon
1950 - Nuno sa Punso: Mila del Sol & Jaime de la Rosa
1950 - Kontrabando: Jaime de la Rosa & Celia Flor
1950 - Hantik
1950 - In Despair
1950 - Prinsipe Amante: Rogelio de la Rosa & Delia Razon
1951 - Reyna Elena
1951 - Satur: Manuel Conde, Jaime de la Rosa, Delia Razon
1951 - Anak ng Pulubi
1951 - Shalimar
1951 - Probinsiyano
1951 - Amor mio
1951 - Haring Kobra: Rogelio dela Rosa, Lilia Dizon
1951 - Pag-asa
1951 - Prinsipe Amante sa Rubitanya: Rogelio dela Rosa, Delia Razon
1951 - Venus
1952 - Rodrigo de Villa: Delia Rzon & Mario Montenegro
1952 - Korea: Jaime de la Rosa, Tony Santos Sr., Leroy Salvador & Nida Blanca
1952 - Sa Paanan ng Nazareno
1952 - Taong Paniki: Jaime de la Rosa, Delia Razon
1952 - Kabalyerong Itim
1952 - Haring Solomon at Reyna Sheba: Mila del Sol
1952 - Dalawang Sundalong Kanin
1952 - Kambal Tuko
1952 - Amor Mio
1952 - Tenyente Carlos Blanco
1952 - Hagad: Armando Goyena, Carmencita Abad & Rosa Rosal
1953 - Huk Sa Bagong Pamumuhay: Jose Padilla, Jr. & Celia Flor
1953 - Kuwentong Bahay-Bahayan: Rolando Acuzar & Nora Dy
1953 - Pusong May Lason: Delia Razon & Mario Montenegro
1953 - Loida
1953 - Batanguena: Jaime dela Rosa, Nida Blanca
1953 - Dalaguinding
1953 - Hijo de Familia
1953 - Hiyasmin
1953 - Squatters
1953 - Loida: Ang Aking Pag-ibig
1953 - Tumbalik ng Daigdig: Nida Blanca & Nestor de Villa
1953 - Kidlat... Ngayon: Armando Goyena
1953 - Dagohoy: Mario Montenegro and Tessie Quintana
1954 - Waray-Waray: Nestor de Villa & Nida Blanca
1954 - Galawgaw: Jaime de la Rosa & Nida Blanca
1954 - Hiyasmin: Nida Blanca & Nestor de Villa
1954 - Dambanang Putik: Delia Razon & Mario Montenegro
1954 - Dalawang Panata
1954 - Virtuoso: Jaime dela Rosa & Delia Razon
1954 - Doce Pares
1954 - Donato
1954 - Tinalikdang Dambana
1954 - Luneta
1954 - Tin-edyer
1955 - Ibong Adarna: Nida Blanca and Nestor De Villa
1955 - Lapu-Lapu: Mario Montenegro & Delia Razon
1955 - Niña Bonita: Jaime de la Rosa, Milagros Naval, Gil de Leon & Charito Solis
1955 - Saydwok Vendor: Nida Blanca & Jaime de la Rosa
1955 - Dinayang Pagmamahal: Jaime de la Rosa, Charito Solis & Rebecca del Rio
1955 - Darling Ko
1955 - Talusaling: Nida Blanca
1955 - Dalagang Taring: Delia Razon & Nestor de Villa
1955 - Higit sa Lahat: Rogelio dela Rosa & Emma Alegre
1955 - Ikaw Kasi: Nida Blanca & Nestor de Villa
1956 - Charito, I Love You: Charito Solis, Leroy Salvador & Nita Javier
1956 - No Money... No Honey: Jaime de la Rosa
1956 - Anak Dalita: Rosa Rosal & Tony Santos, Sr.
1956 - Luksang Tagumpay: Jaime de la Rosa, Delia Razon, Rebecca del Rio & Eddie Rodriguez
1956 - Medalyong Perlas
1956 - Kumander 13
1956 - Aling Kutsero
1956 - Handang Matodas: Nida Blanca, Nestor de Villa & Nita Javier
1956 - Among Tunay: Delia Razon & Mario Montenegro
1956 - Ilaw Sa Karimlan: Delia Razon & Mario Montenegro
1957 - Tiririt ng Ibon: Charito Solis & Leroy Salvador
1957 - Badjao: Rosa Rosal & Tony Santos Sr.
1957 - Hukom Roldan: Jaime de la Rosa, Emma Alegre
1957 - Turista: Nida Blanca & Nestor de Villa
1957 - Bahala Na
1957 - Kalyehera
1957 - El Robo: Delia Razon, Armando Goyena
1957 - Sampung Libong Pisong Pag-ibig: Charito Solis, Eddie Rodriguez & Jose Ejercito (Joseph Estrada)
1957 - Walang Sugat: Charito Solis, Tony Santos Sr. & Mario Montenegro
1958 - Barkada
1958 - Faithful: Lou Salvador, Jr., Marita Zobel, Jaime de la Rosa & Rosa Rosal
1958 - Casa Grande: Nestor de Villa
1958 - Malvarosa: Charito Solis & Leroy Salvador
1958 - Tuloy ang Ligaya: Nida Blanca
1958 - Ang Langit Ko'y Ikaw: Charito Solis, Nestor de Villa, Liza Moreno & Willie Sotelo
1958 - Villa Milagrosa: Charto Solis, Nestor de Villa, Eddie Rodriguez & Nita Javier
1959 - Biyaya ng Lupa: Rosa Rosal & Tony Santos Sr.
1959 - Wala Kang Paki
1959 - Kundiman ng Lahi: Charito Solis
1959 - Tuko Sa Madre Kakao: Nita Javier, Willie Sotelo, Hector Reyes & Luz Valdez
1960 - Black Beauty: Charito Solis & Bernard Bonnin
1960 - Nukso ng Nukso: Pugo, Togo
1960 - Bakit ka Nagtampo
1960 - Unos Sa Laot: Charito Solis and Nestor de Villa
1960 - Kung Ako'y Mahal Mo: Charito Solis & Nestor de Villa
1960 - Emily: Charito Solis, Pancho Magalona, Leroy Salvador & Eddie Rodriguez
1961 - Oh Sendang!: Sylvia La Torre, Pugo, Togo
1961 - Sandata at Pangako: Fernando Poe Jr. & Charito Solis 
1977 - Kung Mangarap Ka't Magising: Christopher de Leon & Hilda Koronel
1980 - Kakabakaba Ka Ba?: Christopher de Leon, Charo Santos, Jay Ilagan, & Sandy Andolong (distribution by D'Wonder Films)
1981 - Batch '81: Mark Gil, Sandy Andolong, Ward Luarca, Noel Trinidad (co-production with Sampaguita Pictures and MVP Pictures)

See also
 Narcisa de Leon
 José Corazón de Jesús, Jr.

References

Further reading
 Mercado, Monina (1977). Doña Sisang and Filipino Movies. Philippines: Vera-Reyes, Inc.

External links
The Unofficial Website of the FAMAS Awards
KabayanCental.com-Vintage Filipino Films
Video 48 Vintage Filipino Films Blog and Movie Ads

ABS-CBN Corporation
Philippine film studios
Mass media companies of the Philippines
Film production companies of the Philippines
Mass media companies established in 1938
Mass media companies disestablished in 2005
Assets owned by ABS-CBN Corporation
2005 disestablishments in the Philippines
Philippine companies established in 1938
Privately held companies